Roderbach or Röderbach may refer to:

Roderbach (Kyll), a river of North Rhine-Westphalia, Germany, downstream called Langbach, a tributary of the Kyll
Röderbach (Aschaff), a river of Bavaria, Germany, tributary of the Aschaff
Röderbach (Hasel), a river of Hesse, Germany, tributary of the Hasel